This list of museums in Georgia contains museums which are defined for this context as institutions (including nonprofit organizations, government entities, and private businesses) that collect and care for objects of cultural, artistic, scientific, or historical interest and make their collections or related exhibits available for public viewing. Museums that exist only in cyberspace (i.e., virtual museums) are not included.

Museums
See List of museums in Atlanta for museums within the city limits of Atlanta and the immediately adjacent communities of Druid Hills and Hapeville, which are located in Fulton County.

 The numbers in the "Regions" column refers to the state government's list of regions, described in a separate section below.

Defunct museums
 Bruce Weiner Microcar Museum, Madison, closed in 2012
 C. E. Blevins Avian Learning Center, Cohutta, collections moved to Chattanooga Arboretum and Nature Center
 Coweta County Heritage Museum and Research Center, Newnan, closed in 2012
 Fort Discovery, Augusta, closed in 2010
 Georgia Children's Museum, Macon, closed in 2014
 Georgia Music Hall of Fame, Macon, closed in 2011
 Lewis Grizzard Museum, Moreland, closed in 2011, collections now at the Moreland Hometown Heritage Museum
 Nash Farm Battlefield Museum, closed June 1, 2017
 National Museum of Patriotism, Atlanta, closed in 2010
 Old Mill Motorcycle Museum, Juliette, photos
 SciTrek, a science museum in Atlanta
 Stone Mountain Antique Car and Treasure Museum, Stone Mountain, closed in 2008, featured vintage cars and antique items
 U.S. Navy Supply Corps Museum, Athens, closed in 2010

Tourism regions
The Georgia Department of Economic Development has defined nine tourism regions as listed below with their associated travel associations as footnotes.

Classic South
East central part of the state, includes the city of Augusta

Georgia Coast
Also known as the Colonial Coast, includes the city of Savannah

Historic Heartland
Central part of the state, includes the cities of Macon and Athens

Northwest Georgia
Northwest region, includes Chickamauga

Magnolia Midlands
Southeast section, includes Statesboro, Counties: Appling, Atkinson, Bacon, Bleckley, Bulloch, Candler, Coffee, Dodge, Evans, Irwin, Jeff Davis, Laurens, Long, Montgomery, Pulaski, Screven, Tattnall, Telfair, Toombs, Treutlen, Wayne, Wheeler, and Wilcox.

Metro Atlanta

Northeast Georgia Mountains
Northeast region, counties: Banks, Dawson, Elbert, Forsyth, Franklin, Habersham, Hall, Hart, Jackson, Lumpkin, Madison, Rabun, Stephens, Towns, Union, and White

Plantation Trace
Rural southwestern section, includes Fitzgerald

Presidential Pathways
West central section, includes Columbus and Plains

See also
Lists of other institutions in Georgia similar to museums:
 Aquaria (category)
 Nature centers in Georgia

References

External links
 Georgia Department of Economic Development web page on Georgia museums
 Georgia Association of Museums and Galleries
 Census Finder "Historical Museum Guide for Georgia"
 Explore Georgia
 Atlanta Metro Travel Association

Georgia

Museums
Museums
Museums